Puente Alto (Spanish: "High Bridge") is a city and commune of Chile. It is the capital of the Cordillera Province in the Santiago Metropolitan Region. Located at the south of the Great Santiago conurbation (of which it is part), it houses 568,106 inhabitants (city proper, 2017 census), making it the most populous commune in Chile.

History

After 1883, the province of Santiago was divided into three departments: Santiago, La Victoria and Melipilla. In 1891 the "Autonomic Commune Law" was enacted, after which the president signed as the "Decree of the Creation of Municipalities."

From this decree the department of La Victoria was divided into the municipalities of Peñaflor, Talagante, Calera de Tango, San José de Maipo and Lo Cañas.

According to regional law, the authorities of this new sector would be able to increase in proportion to the number of inhabitants in the area, as well as adding three additional mayors the bureaucratic structure. This law was passed with the aim of giving more individual power to the remote areas of the fast-growing city, instead of everything being governed as a whole under La Victoria.

Demographics
Of these, 492,603 (99.9%) lived in urban areas and 312 (0.1%) not.

Administration
As a commune, Puente Alto is a third-level administrative division of Chile administered by a municipal council, headed by an alcalde who is directly elected every four years. The 2016-2020 alcalde is Germán Codina Powers (RN). The communal council has the following members:
 Bernardita Paul Ossandón (RN)
 Ivonne Teruel Valenzuela IND-(RN)
 Olivier Mellado Rodriguez (RN)
 Karina Órdenes Ramírez (RN)
 Luis Escanilla Benavides (PS)
 Juan Marticorena Franco (RN)
 María Teresa Alvear Valenzuela (PDC)
 César Bunster Ariztia (PC)
 Caroline Lara Castillo IND-(RN)
 René Yáñez Ahumada IND-(RN)

Within the electoral divisions of Chile, Puente Alto is represented in the Chamber of Deputies by
Álvaro Carter (UDI), Ximena Ossandón (RN), Leopoldo Pérez (RN), Amaro Labra (PC), Camila Vallejos (PC), Pamela Jiles (PH) and Miguel Crispi (RD) as part of the 12th electoral district, (together with La Florida, Pirque, San José de Maipo and La Pintana). The commune is represented in the Senate by Manuel José Ossandón Irarrázaval (RN), Carlos Montes Cisternas (PS), Andrés Allamand Zavala (RN) and Guido Girardi Lavín (PPD) as part of the 7th senatorial constituency (Santiago Metropolitan Region).

Transportation

Puente Alto is connected to the rest of Santiago vía two forms of organized public transportation.

First, the Metro Bus, which can be taken from anywhere in Puente Alto to arrive eventually to downtown Santiago.

Puente Alto is also home to the most southerly station of the Santiago Metro, Estación Plaza de Puente Alto. Travel time to downtown Santiago by metro train is approximately 45 minutes.

Areas of Interest

Estadio Municipal 
Puente Alto's city stadium is located in #450 Nemesio Vicuña Street, it has a soccer playing field and an athletics track. It has a capacity of 1900 people, making it one of the biggest sport centres of the commune including the sports complex Amador Donoso in this list.

On May 30, 2011, the city stadium was re-inaugurated by the Mayor Manuel J. Ossandón, a lot of neighbours were invited to the opening ceremony.

The stadium has 4 bathroom, smart illumination, and 10 exercise machines available to the people of the town. There are no requirements to use these facilities.

Mampato Amusement Park 
Mampato is an amusement park which has different games for children and teenagers. It was opened in 1975 by Mr. Felipe Rodríguez Lobbé in Lo Barnechea.

Its main attractions were the trains, the trampolines and tricycles. In addition, there was a show called "Far West", where there were Cowboys and Indians.

It was inaugurated in 1998 in Las Vizcachas, Puente Alto. Currently, the rides are a wheel, train, roller coaster and slide. Apart from these, Mampato has got many other rides.

The general ticket costs 7.000 Chilean pesos.

Pueblito Las Vizcachas 

"Pueblito las Vizcachas" is a large, well-maintained park in Puente Alto frequented by families and neighbors in the area. The park opened on December 30, 2015. Visitors have the opportunity to practice kayaking, observe different farm animals, picnic, play sports, and enjoy other activities in the green areas without paying an entrance fee. Mayor Germán Codina, the park's creator, has also stated plans to further its development with amenities such as restaurants starting in 2019.

Gallery

See also
 Bajos de Mena

References

External links
  Municipality of Puente Alto
 http://deportespuentealto.cl/?page_id=25

Communes of Chile
Populated places established in 1898
Populated places in Cordillera Province
Capitals of Chilean provinces
1898 establishments in Chile